Junius S. Mobley (died January 2, 1904), also known as June Mobley, was a politician in South Carolina. He was considered an ultra-radical, and was one of South Carolina's 1868 Radical Republican members of the Legislature. He reportedly became a preacher after the Reconstruction era. Mobley was a political leader during the Reconstruction era in South Carolina and was involved in the distribution of ammunition to freedmen. He was part of the Union Brotherhood that replaced the Union League in 1872. Mobley was from Union County, South Carolina. John Schreiner Reynolds wrote about Mobley and other African American legislators in 1905. He was not a fan of Mobley's, and described him as "mulatto" and said he gave incendiary speeches causing bloodshed for the "men of his own race". He also referred to Mobley as a "vicious and mouthy Negro".

See also
Joseph Crews

References

1904 deaths

Union County, South Carolina
African-American politicians during the Reconstruction Era
Radical Republican Party politicians
American freedmen
Members of the South Carolina House of Representatives